Jeunesse Sportive de la Saoura, referred to as JS Saoura or JSS for short, is an Algerian handball team, as a division of the of JS Saoura.

History
On March 29, 2018, JS Saoura managed to achieve a historic rise to Division Excellence two rounds before the end of the season, which was not more than four years old. Needing only one point to reach, JS Saoura players scored their goal in the match, against RC Larbaâ's team (22–22) for (Western Group), and Mohamed Zerouati announced that he will invest next season in training young handball players. In the 2020–21 season, which is a complement to the previous season, which was stopped due to COVID-19 pandemic in Algeria, JS Saoura achieved the runner-up for the first time and in favor of JSE Skikda. On October 16, 2021, JS Saoura won a historic title by winning the Super Cup for the first time after defeating the league title holder JSE Skikda with a score of 23–22. This Supercup final was marked by the return of the public to the stands a first since the spread of the COVID-19 pandemic in Algeria in March 2019.

Honours

National titles 
 Algerian Handball Supercup
Winners (1): 2020

Statistics

Recent seasons

Notes

References

External links

JS Saoura
Algerian handball clubs